Moon Hotel Kabul is a 2018 Romanian-French drama film directed by Anca Damian and written by Damian and Lia Bugnar. It tells the story of Ivan (played by Florin Piersic Jr.), a charismatic but cynical journalist who starts to reconsider his life after Ioana (played by Ofelia Popii), a translator with whom he has had a one-night stand in a hotel in Kabul, commits suicide one day later. The film was shot in 2016, in Bucharest and Morocco, "as it was too risky to shoot in Kabul at that time".

The film premiered on October 18, 2018 at the Warsaw Film Festival where Damian received the Best Director award. It was theatrically released in Romanian on November 30, 2018. At the 2019 Gopo Awards, Alexandru Nagy was nominated for Best Actor in a Supporting Role, and Popii and Rodica Negrea were nominated for Best Actress in a Supporting Role.

References

External links 
 

2018 films
2018 drama films
Romanian drama films
French drama films
Films set in Afghanistan
Films set in Romania
2010s French films